Follow the Boys also known as Three Cheers for the Boys is a 1944 musical film made by Universal Pictures during World War II as an all-star cast morale booster to entertain the troops abroad and the civilians at home. The film was directed by A. Edward "Eddie" Sutherland and produced by Charles K. Feldman. The movie stars George Raft and Vera Zorina and features Grace McDonald, Charles Grapewin, Regis Toomey and George Macready.  At one point in the film, Orson Welles saws Marlene Dietrich in half during a magic show.  W.C. Fields, in his first movie since 1941, performs a classic pool-playing presentation he first developed in vaudeville four decades earlier in 1903.

Making appearances are Walter Abel, Carmen Amaya, The Andrews Sisters, Evelyn Ankers, Louise Beavers, Noah Beery Jr., Turhan Bey, Steve Brodie, Nigel Bruce, Lon Chaney Jr., the Delta Rhythm Boys, Andy Devine, Marlene Dietrich, W. C. Fields, Susanna Foster, Thomas Gomez, Louis Jordan and His Orchestra, Ted Lewis and His Band, Jeanette MacDonald, Maria Montez, Clarence Muse, Donald O'Connor, Slapsie Maxie Rosenbloom, Arthur Rubinstein, Peggy Ryan, Randolph Scott, Dinah Shore, Freddie Slack and His Orchestra, Gale Sondergaard, Sophie Tucker, and Orson Welles, among many others.

Plot
Tony West performs in vaudeville in a group with his father Nick and sister Kitty, The decline of vaudeville forces the group to split up and Tony goes to Hollywood to try to make it in movies. He works at Universal Pictures, where he becomes screen partners with, and then the husband of, star Gloria Vance.

When World War II breaks out, Tony tries to enlist but is refused because of his knee. Tony finds himself organising the Hollywood Victory Committee (H.V.C.), a consortium of motion picture, theatrical and radio personalities dedicated to help the war effort.

He puts on a show that includes performances from Donald O'Connor and Jeannette MacDonald.

Tony and Gloria have a big fight and she doesn't tell him that she is pregnant. Tony organizes another show, where Welles performs magic tricks including sawing Dietrich in half.

Tony goes overseas and is killed during an attack by a Japanese submarine.  Gloria takes Tony's place entertaining the troops.

Cast
 George Raft as Tony West
 Vera Zorina as Gloria Vance
 Charles Grapewin as Nick West
 Grace McDonald as Kitty
 Charles Butterworth as Louie West
 George Macready as Bruce
 Elizabeth Patterson as Annie
 Theodore von Eltz as Barrett
 Regis Toomey as Doctor Henderson
 Ramsay Ames as Laura
 W.C. Fields as himself
 Spooks as Junior
 And Molly Lamont, Doris Lloyd, Nelson Leigh, Lane Chandler, Cyril Ring, Emmett Vogan, Addison Richards, Stanley Andrews, Frank Jenks, Ralph Dunn, Billy Benedict, Howard C. Hickman, Edwin Stanley, Wallis Clark, Richard Crane, Frank Wilcox, Clyde Cook, Bobby Barber, Walter Tetley, Anthony Warde, William Forrest, Dennis Moore, Duke York, Carlyle Blackwell, Edwin Stanley, Charles King

Production
The film was announced in June 1943. It was produced by Charles K. Feldman and was inspired by the success of Stage Door Canteen at Warner Bros. The original title was Three Cheers for the Boys. George Raft signed in July 1943. It was his first movie after leaving Warner Bros.

The cast featured several Universal contract stars, including Donald O'Connor and Peggy Ryan, as well as some actors who had just recently made films for Universal, such as Raft and Marlene Dietrich.

The film was shot at the Naval Training Center San Diego.

The movie features a speech at the end about "soldiers in greasepaint", a tribute to those who entertained the troops during World War II. It features an "honor roll" which lists those entertainers who died in the war, including Carole Lombard, Leslie Howard, Roy Rognan, Tamara, Charles King and Bob Ripa.

Reception
The New York Times called a "sentimental tribute... cheap screen entertainment – and hardly a tribute to the players it presents."

Songs and acts
George Raft – several dance numbers
Vera Zorina – dances to "A Better Day is Coming" and "I Feel a Song Coming On"
George Raft and Zorina – dance to "Tonight"
Delta Rhythm Boys – "The House I Live In"
The Andrews Sisters – "Shoo Shoo Baby" and a medley of their hits including "Bei Mir Bist Du Schön", "Hold Tight, Hold Tight (Want Some Seafood, Mama)", "The Beer Barrel Polka", "The Boogie Woogie Bugle Boy of Company B", "I'll Be With You in Apple Blossom Time", "Pennsylvania Polka", "Victory Polka"
Sophie Tucker – "The Bigger the Army and the Navy" and "Some of These Day"
Donald O'Connor and Peggy Ryan – "Kittens With Their Mittens Laced"
Jeanette MacDonald – "Beyond the Blue Horizon" and "I'll See You in My Dreams"
Orson Welles – performs a magic show including sawing Marlene Dietrich in half
Dinah Shore – "I'll Get By", "I'll Walk Alone", "Mad About Him Blues"
Arthur Rubenstein – performs "Liebestraum No. 3 (A Dream of Love)" 
Louis Jordan – "Is You Is or Is You Ain't Ma' Baby", and "Sweet Georgia Brown", with Raft performing the charleston
W. C. Fields – performs a comedy routine involving a billiard table
Carmen Amaya – "Merriment"
the Delta Rhythm Boys
Gautier's performing dogs
Charlie Spivak and his Orchestra – "Swing Low, Sweet Chariot " and "Besame Mucho"
Ted Lewis – "Good Night"

Accolades
The film is recognized by American Film Institute in these lists:
 2004: AFI's 100 Years...100 Songs:	
 "I'll Walk Alone" – Nominated

Home media
 1994: MCA Home Video, VHS (80594), 1994
 2008: Universal Pictures UK, DVD (825 816 2), region PAL, 2008 [running time 106 minutes] <reference from DVD package>

See also
List of American films of 1944

References

External links
 
 
 
 

1944 films
1940s musical comedy-drama films
1940s romantic comedy-drama films
1940s romantic musical films
American musical comedy-drama films
American romantic comedy-drama films
American romantic musical films
American black-and-white films
Films directed by A. Edward Sutherland
Universal Pictures films
Films scored by Leigh Harline
Films set in Los Angeles
Japan in non-Japanese culture
1940s English-language films
1940s American films